USS Tomahawk is a name used more than once by the U.S. Navy:

  laid down under Maritime Commission contract (MC hull 1267) on 1 June 1943.
  laid down in January 1966 at Marinette, Wisconsin.

United States Navy ship names